Superboy is a DC Comics superhero

Superboy or Super Boy may also refer to:

DC Comics
Superboy (comic book), comic book series by DC Comics featuring Superboy
DC Comics characters who have assumed the mantle of Superboy
Superboy (Kal-El)
Superboy (Kon-El)
Superboy-Prime
Jon Lane Kent
Jon Kent (DC Comics)

TV series
Superboy (TV series), a 1980s television series based on the DC Comics character Superboy
Super Boy (TV series), a Chinese reality singing competition 
Superboy, a 2010 Indonesian drama TV series starring Hengky Kurniawan and Julia Perez
Clark Kent (Smallville), a character on the 2000s television series Smallville

See also
Super Boy Allan, an educational video game
Superman (disambiguation)
Supergirl (disambiguation)
Clark Kent (disambiguation)